Encalyptaceae is a family of mosses in order Encalyptales.  It includes two genera; the genus Bryobartramia, formerly included in the family, is now placed in its own family.

References

Moss families
Encalyptales